In statistics, Bessel's correction is the use of n − 1 instead of n in the formula for the sample variance and sample standard deviation, where n is the number of observations in a sample. This method corrects the bias in the estimation of the population variance. It also partially corrects the bias in the estimation of the population standard deviation. However, the correction often increases the mean squared error in these estimations. This technique is named after Friedrich Bessel.

Formulation
In estimating the population variance from a sample when the population mean is unknown, the uncorrected sample variance is the mean of the squares of deviations of sample values from the sample mean (i.e. using a multiplicative factor 1/n). In this case, the sample variance is a biased estimator of the population variance.
Multiplying the uncorrected sample variance by the factor

 

gives an unbiased estimator of the population variance. In some literature, the above factor is called Bessel's correction.

One can understand Bessel's correction as the degrees of freedom in the residuals vector (residuals, not errors, because the population mean is unknown):

 

where  is the sample mean. While there are n independent observations in the sample, there are only n − 1 independent residuals, as they sum to 0. For a more intuitive explanation of the need for Bessel's correction, see .

Generally Bessel's correction is an approach to reduce the bias due to finite sample size. Such finite-sample bias correction is also needed for other estimates like skew and kurtosis, but in these the inaccuracies are often significantly larger. To fully remove such bias it is necessary to do a more complex multi-parameter estimation. For instance a correct correction for the standard deviation depends on the kurtosis (normalized central 4th moment), but this again has a finite sample bias and it depends on the standard deviation, i.e. both estimations have to be merged.

Caveats

There are three caveats to consider regarding Bessel's correction:

 It does not yield an unbiased estimator of standard deviation.
 The corrected estimator often has a higher mean squared error (MSE) than the uncorrected estimator. Furthermore, there is no population distribution for which it has the minimum MSE because a different scale factor can always be chosen to minimize MSE.
 It is only necessary when the population mean is unknown (and estimated as the sample mean). In practice, this generally happens.

Firstly, while the sample variance (using Bessel's correction) is an unbiased estimator of the population variance, its square root, the sample standard deviation, is a biased estimate of the population standard deviation; because the square root is a concave function, the bias is downward, by Jensen's inequality. There is no general formula for an unbiased estimator of the population standard deviation, though there are correction factors for particular distributions, such as the normal; see unbiased estimation of standard deviation for details. An approximation for the exact correction factor for the normal distribution is given by using n − 1.5 in the formula: the bias decays quadratically (rather than linearly, as in the uncorrected form and Bessel's corrected form).

Secondly, the unbiased estimator does not minimize mean squared error (MSE), and generally has worse MSE than the uncorrected estimator (this varies with excess kurtosis). MSE can be minimized by using a different factor. The optimal value depends on excess kurtosis, as discussed in mean squared error: variance; for the normal distribution this is optimized by dividing by n + 1 (instead of n − 1 or n).

Thirdly, Bessel's correction is only necessary when the population mean is unknown, and one is estimating both population mean and population variance from a given sample, using the sample mean to estimate the population mean. In that case there are n degrees of freedom in a sample of n points, and simultaneous estimation of mean and variance means one degree of freedom goes to the sample mean and the remaining n − 1 degrees of freedom (the residuals) go to the sample variance. However, if the population mean is known, then the deviations of the observations from the population mean have n degrees of freedom (because the mean is not being estimated – the deviations are not residuals but errors) and Bessel's correction is not applicable.

Source of bias 

Most simply, to understand the bias that needs correcting, think of an extreme case. A sample of n = 1 is drawn, and it turns out to be  The best estimate of the population mean is  But what if we use the formula  to estimate the variance? The  estimate of  the variance would be zero – and  the estimate would be zero for any population and any sample of n = 1. The problem is that in estimating the sample mean, the process has already made our estimate of the mean close to the value we sampled--identical, for n = 1. In the case of n = 1, the variance just cannot be estimated, because there is no variability in the sample. 

But consider n = 2. Suppose the sample were (0, 2).

To see this in more detail, consider the following example. Suppose the mean of the whole population is 2050, but the statistician does not know that, and must estimate it based on this small sample chosen randomly from the population:

 

One may compute the sample average:
 

This may serve as an observable estimate of the unobservable population average, which is 2050.  Now we face the problem of estimating the population variance.  That is the average of the squares of the deviations from 2050.  If we knew that the population average is 2050, we could proceed as follows:
 

But our estimate of the population average is the sample average, 2052. The actual average, 2050, is unknown.  So the sample average, 2052, must be used:
 

The variance is now a lot smaller. As proven below, the variance will almost always be smaller when calculated using the sum of squared distances to the sample mean, compared to using the sum of squared distances to the population mean. The one exception to this is when the sample mean happens to be equal to the population mean, in which case the variance is also equal.

To see why this happens, we use a simple identity in algebra:
 

With  representing the deviation of an individual sample from the sample mean, and  representing the deviation of the sample mean from the population mean.   Note that we've simply decomposed the actual deviation of an individual sample from the (unknown) population mean into two components: the deviation of the single sample from the sample mean, which we can compute, and the additional deviation of the sample mean from the population mean, which we can not.  Now, we apply this identity to the squares of deviations from the population mean:
 

Now apply this to all five observations and observe certain patterns:
 

The sum of the entries in the middle column must be zero because the term a will be added across all 5 rows, which itself must equal zero. That is because a contains the 5 individual samples (left side within parentheses) which – when added – naturally have the same sum as adding 5 times the sample mean of those 5 numbers (2052). This means that a subtraction of these two sums must equal zero. The factor 2 and the term b in the middle column are equal for all rows, meaning that the relative difference across all rows in the middle column stays the same and can therefore be disregarded. The following statements explain the meaning of the remaining columns:

 The sum of the entries in the first column (a2) is the sum of the squares of the distance from sample to sample mean;
The sum of the entries in the last column (b2) is the sum of squared distances between the measured sample mean and the correct population mean
 Every single row now consists of pairs of a2 (biased, because the sample mean is used) and b2 (correction of bias, because it takes the difference between the "real" population mean and the inaccurate sample mean into account). Therefore the sum of all entries of the first and last column now represents the correct variance, meaning that now the sum of squared distance between samples and population mean is used
 The sum of the a2-column and the b2-column must be bigger than the sum within entries of the a2-column, since all the entries within the b2-column are positive (except when the population mean is the same as the sample mean, in which case all of the numbers in the last column will be 0).

Therefore:
 The sum of squares of the distance from samples to the population mean will always be bigger than the sum of squares of the distance to the sample mean, except when the sample mean happens to be the same as the population mean, in which case the two are equal.

That is why the sum of squares of the deviations from the sample mean is too small to give an unbiased estimate of the population variance when the average of those squares is found. The smaller the sample size, the larger is the difference between the sample variance and the population variance.

Terminology 
This correction is so common that the term "sample variance" and "sample standard deviation" are frequently used to mean the corrected estimators (unbiased sample variation, less biased sample standard deviation), using n − 1. However caution is needed: some calculators and software packages may provide for both or only the more unusual formulation.  This article uses the following symbols and definitions:

μ is the population mean
 is the sample mean
σ2 is the population variance
sn2 is the biased sample variance (i.e. without Bessel's correction)
s2 is the unbiased sample variance (i.e. with Bessel's correction)

The standard deviations will then be the square roots of the respective variances. Since the square root introduces bias, the terminology "uncorrected" and "corrected" is preferred for the standard deviation estimators:

sn is the uncorrected sample standard deviation (i.e. without Bessel's correction)
s is the corrected sample standard deviation (i.e. with Bessel's correction), which is less biased, but still biased

Formula 
The sample mean is given by

The biased sample variance is then written:

and the unbiased sample variance is written:

Proof of correctness

Alternative 1
As a background fact, we use the identity  which follows from the definition of the standard deviation and linearity of expectation.

A very helpful observation is that for any distribution, the variance equals half the expected value of  when  are an independent sample from that distribution. To prove this observation we will use that  (which follows from the fact that they are independent) as well as linearity of expectation:

Now that the observation is proven, it suffices to show that the expected squared difference of two observations from the sample population  equals  times the expected squared difference of two observations from the original distribution. To see this, note that when we pick  and  via u, v being integers selected independently and uniformly from 1 to n, a fraction  of the time we will have u = v and therefore the sampled squared difference is zero independent of the original distribution.

Alternative 2
Recycling an identity for variance,

and by definition,

Note that, since x1, x2, …, xn are a random sample from a distribution with mean μ and variance σ2, it follows that for each i = 1, 2, …, n:

    and    

and also
    and    

This is a property of the variance of uncorrelated variables, arising from the Bienaymé formula. The required result is then obtained by substituting these two formulae:

Alternative 3
The expected discrepancy between the biased estimator and the true variance is

So, the expected value of the biased estimator will be 

So, an unbiased estimator should be given by

Intuition 
In the biased estimator, by using the sample mean instead of the true mean, each xi − µ is underestimated by x − µ. We know that the variance of a sum is the sum of the variances (for uncorrelated variables). So, to find the discrepancy between the biased estimator and the true variance, we just need to find the expected value of (x − µ)2.

This is just the variance of the sample mean, which is σ2/n. So, we expect that the biased estimator underestimates σ2 by σ2/n, and so the biased estimator = (1 − 1/n) × the unbiased estimator = (n − 1)/n × the unbiased estimator.

See also
 Bias of an estimator
 Standard deviation
 Unbiased estimation of standard deviation
 Jensen's inequality

Notes

External links
 
 Animated experiment demonstrating the correction, at Khan Academy

Statistical deviation and dispersion
Estimation methods
Articles containing proofs